was the first of four main administrative districts of the pre-war Imperial Japanese Navy. Its territory included Tokyo Bay and the Pacific coasts of central and northern Honshū from the Kii Peninsula to Shimokita Peninsula.  Its headquarters, along with most of its installations, including the Yokosuka Naval Arsenal, were located in the city of Yokosuka, which constituted the Yokosuka Naval Base.

History
The location of Yokosuka at the entrance to strategic Tokyo Bay was recognized of critical importance by the Tokugawa shogunate and early Meiji government. In 1866, the Tokugawa shogunate government established the Yokosuka Seisakusho, a military arsenal and naval base, with the help of foreign engineers, including the French naval architect Léonce Verny. The new facility was intended to produce modern, western-style warships and equipment for the Tokugawa navy. After the Boshin War and the Meiji Restoration, the new Meiji government took over control of the facility in 1871, renaming it the Yokosuka Zosenjo (Yokosuka Shipyards). In August 1876, the Imperial Japanese Navy was organized into eastern and a western strategic zones, with the eastern zone  based at Yokosuka, and the western zone  based at Nagasaki. However, for ease of communications with naval headquarters in Tokyo, the Tōkai Naval District was relocated to Yokohama in September 1876.

With the reorganization of the Imperial Japanese Navy in April 1886, Japan was divided into five naval districts for recruiting and supply, and the headquarters for the Tokai Naval District was relocated back to Yokosuka, becoming the Yokosuka Naval District, and the Yokosuka Naval Arsenal was placed under its command. As with all naval districts, it was under the direction of the Navy Ministry during peacetime, and came under the command of the fleets stationed within the district in time of war.
A Bureau of Torpedo Warfare was established at Yokusuka in June 1885. A Bureau of Mine Warfare was also established. In 1893, schools for naval mechanical engineering, torpedo warfare and naval artillery were established. Schools for naval engineering, and for mine warfare followed in 1907 and a naval medical center in 1908. Naval aviation facilities were established in June 1912, followed by a wireless communications facility in April 1913.

On January 14, 1917, the armoured cruiser Tsukuba exploded and sank in Yokosuka port in an accident. The Naval Construction Department was established in 1921. In June 1930, a Naval Communications School was established, but the Naval Mine School was made independent of the naval district. A Naval Aviation School was established in April 1934.

Pacific war
At the time of the attack on Pearl Harbor in 1941, Yokosuka Naval District encompassed the following 
 Yokosuka Naval District HQ
 Yokosuka Naval Base
 Yokosuka Naval Base HQ
 Yokosuka Communications Center
 Yokosuka Supply Department
 Accounting Department
 Construction Department
 Ports & Docks Unit
 Yokosuka Naval Arsenal
 Naval Hospital
 Naval Prison
 Naval Fuel Depot
 Yokosuka Base Garrison
 Yokosuka 1st Naval Barracks
 Yokosuka 2nd Naval Barracks
 Yokosuka Special Naval Landing Forces
 Yokosuka Submarine Base
 Yokosuka Security Squadron
 Auxiliary Cruiser Noshiro Maru, Auxiliary gunboat Shoei Maru, Meiji Maru No. 1
 Yokosuka Local Defence Squadron
 Minesweeper Division 25; Auxiliary minesweeper Misago Maru No. 1, Misago Maru No. 3, Kongo Maru No. 2, Naruo Maru, Shintohoku Maru, Togo Maru
 Minesweeper Division 26; Auxiliary minesweeper Banshu Maru No. 18, Keijin Maru No. 1, Keijin Maru No. 2, Showa Maru No. 10, 
 Submarine tender Komahashi
 Destroyer , 
 Submarine Chaser No. 22, No. 23
 Yokosuka Naval Air Group (Oppama)
 Tateyama Naval Air Group
 Kisarazu Naval Air Group
 11th Combined Air Group (Training)
 Kasumigaura Naval Air Group
 Tsukuba Naval Air Group
 Yatabe Naval Air Group
 Hyakurihara Naval Air Group (Ibaraki Pref)
 Kashima Naval Air Group
 Suzuka Naval Air Group
 Tsuchiura Naval Air Group

In May 1945, Michitaro Tozuka became the final commander of the Yokosuka Naval District. Yokosuka was bombed by United States Navy and United States Army Air Forces aircraft in the final stages of the Pacific War, most notably during the attack on Yokosuka on 18 July 1945, but many of its facilities were captured intact by the Allied forces. The Yokosuka area came under occupation by American forces during the occupation of Japan, and most of the facilities of the former Yokosuka Naval District were inherited by the United States 7th Fleet and are now known as United States Fleet Activities Yokosuka. A small portion of the area continues to be used by the modern post-war Japanese Maritime Self-Defense Force and are now known as JMSDF Yokosuka Naval Base, which has preserved a portion of the original red brick gates.

List of commanders

Commander of Tōkai Naval District

Director of Yokusuka Naval District

Commanding officers of Yokusuka Naval District

See also
 United States Fleet Activities Yokosuka
 Japan Maritime Self-Defense Force#District Forces

References
Notes

Bibliography
 
 
 Senshi Sōsho Vol. 80, Combined Fleet #2, "Until June 1942", Asagumo Simbun (Tokyo, Japan), 1975.

Imperial Japanese Navy